Device – Voice – Drum is a live DVD by American rock band Kansas, released in 2002. The same concert was released as an enhanced   
double-CD live album. The CD release features the enhanced live track, "Distant Vision".

The DVD includes a short Animusic animation of a portion of the song "Miracles Out of Nowhere". Animusic also provided the CD/DVD cover art.

Track listings
All songs written by Kerry Livgren, except where noted.

DVD track listing
 "Intro" – 1:26
 "Belexes"/"Lightning's Hand" (Livgren/Livgren, Walsh) – 6:43
 "Icarus II" – 7:12
 "Icarus - Borne on Wings of Steel" – 6:27
 "Song for America" – 9:27 
 "Howlin' at the Moon" (from "Magnum Opus") (Phil Ehart, Dave Hope, Livgren, Robby Steinhardt, Steve Walsh, Rich Williams) – 2:00
 "The Wall" (Livgren, Walsh) – 5:43
 "The Preacher" (Steve Morse, Walsh) – 4:18
 "Journey from Mariabronn" (Livgren, Walsh) – 9:17
 "Dust in the Wind" – 4:26
 "Cheyenne Anthem" – 7:19
 "Child of Innocence" – 4:54
 "Miracles Out of Nowhere" – 6:36
 "Point of Know Return" (Ehart, Steinhardt, Walsh) – 3:17
 "Portrait (He Knew)"/"The Pinnacle" (Livgren, Walsh/Livgren) – 8:08
 "Fight Fire with Fire" (John Elefante, Dino Elefante) – 3:19
 "Play the Game Tonight" (Livgren, Williams, Ehart, Danny Flower, Rob Frazier) – 3:49
 "Carry On Wayward Son" – 7:21

DVD bonus features
 Looking Back – 3:05
 DVD Thoughts – 3:11
 Songs – 2:54
 Making of Device, Voice, Drum – 7:25
 Kansas Discography (with voice-over) – 4:23
 Animusic Previews  – 2:23
Instruments
 Percussion instruments including the drum set, metallophone and gong
 Bass guitar in "tower"
 Calliope
 Hammered harpsichord
 Organ chorus lights
 Lead synth lasers
 Green electric guitar laser
 Electric Violin with a laser
This Animusic animation has a Future Retro drum kit and its robotic drummer with two arms. The tower bass guitar (connected to this robot) is one of the Harmonic Voltage instruments. The violin laser is blue and sounds like an electric violin.

CD track listing
Disc one
 "Intro" – 1:26
 "Belexes"/"Lightning's Hand" – 6:43
 "Icarus II" – 7:12
 "Icarus - Borne on Wings of Steel" – 6:27
 "Song for America" – 9:27 
 "Howlin' at the Moon" (from "Magnum Opus") – 2:00
 "The Wall" – 5:43
 "The Preacher" – 4:18
 "Journey from Mariabronn" – 9:17
 "Dust in the Wind" – 4:26
 "Cheyenne Anthem" – 7:19
 "Child of Innocence" – 4:54

Disc two
 "Miracles Out of Nowhere" – 6:36
 "Point of Know Return" – 3:17
 "Portrait (He Knew)"/"The Pinnacle" – 8:08
 "Fight Fire with Fire" – 3:19
 "Play the Game Tonight" – 3:49
 "Carry On Wayward Son" – 7:21
 "Distant Vision" – 7:14 (live video)

Personnel
Kansas
Steve Walsh - keyboards, lead vocals
Robby Steinhardt - violin, vocals
Rich Williams - electric and acoustic guitars
Billy Greer - bass, vocals, acoustic guitar
Phil Ehart - drums, producer

Additional musicians
The New Advent Choir directed by Yergan Jones
String quartet arranged by Larry Baird:
Tirza Kosche, Jeanne Johnson-Watkins - violins
Cindy Beard - viola
Anna Joyner - cello

Production
Steve Rawls - co-producer, engineer, mixing
Michie Turpin - director
Jeff Glixman - mixing
Hank Willams, Jim Kaiser - mastering at MasterMix, Nashville, Tennessee

References

External links
[ Allmusic link]

Kansas (band) live albums
2002 live albums
2002 video albums
Live video albums
SPV/Steamhammer video albums
SPV/Steamhammer live albums